Andrew Hamilton (10 June 1882 – 20 July 1915) was a Scottish professional football forward who made one appearance in the Scottish League for Aberdeen.

Personal life 
Hamilton served as a private in the Gordon Highlanders during the First World War and was killed in West Flanders, Belgium on 20 July 1915, having only arrived on the Western Front two months earlier. He is commemorated on the Menin Gate.

Career statistics

References 

Scottish footballers
1915 deaths
British Army personnel of World War I
British military personnel killed in World War I
Scottish Football League players
Association football forwards
Aberdeen F.C. players
1882 births
Footballers from Aberdeen
Gordon Highlanders soldiers